The Lomwe people are one of the largest tribes in Mozambique and Malawi; in the latter, they are the second largest populace after the Chewa. Their language is commonly spoken throughout central Mozambique. In Malawi,  people speak the Malawi Lomwe language. Late former president Bingu wa Mutharika and his brother, Peter Mutharika (another president of the Republic of Malawi), belong to this ethnic group.

References